Chloroclystis mokensis is a moth in the  family Geometridae. It is found in Equatorial Guinea (Bioko) and on the Seychelles (Mahé).

References

Moths described in 1937
Chloroclystis